Cart noodle  is a noodle dish which became popular in Hong Kong and Macau in the 1950s through independent street vendors operating on roadsides and in public housing estates in low-income districts, using carts. Many street vendors have vanished but the name and style of noodle endures as a cultural icon.

History
With many immigrants arriving from mainland China during the 1950s, hawkers would sell food out of a cart roaming the streets. Some vendors specialising in cooked noodles would sell them with an assortment of toppings and styles.

Historically, the cart frames were assembled out of wood with metallic basins.  It allowed the heat inside to cook the ingredients. In the old days, it was possible to receive large quantities for a cheap price. The noodles were considered "cheap and nasty".  Cost was generally low to appeal to the average citizens.  It was known for its poor hygiene. As such, they were also commonly referred to as "filthy noodle" (嗱喳麵). Since hygiene standards rose, many street vendors (licensed or otherwise) have vanished.

Legacy
The name and style of the noodle endures, and remain widely available in low- to mid-end eateries. The price may vary depending on the combination of ingredients, or type of establishments. On the contrary, because the noodle is now defined by its retro style, it can sometimes be found in higher-end establishments.  It may offer costlier types of ingredients at a higher price.

Typical combinations
Cart noodles is typically based upon the diner choosing various ingredients they would like, including the type of noodles, various soup broths, and toppings. Examples of types of noodles and toppings, which may vary considerably from stall to stall:

Toppings

 Pig skin (豬皮)
 Curdled pig's blood (豬紅)
 Pig intestine (豬大腸)
 Pig oviduct (生腸)
 Red Chinese sausage (紅腸)
 Pork sausage
 Chicken wing (雞翼)
 Spam (餐肉)
 Omasum (牛百葉)
 Beef ball (牛丸)
 Beef offal
 Pork ball (豬肉丸)
 Fried fishball (炸魚蛋)
 Cuttlefish ball (墨魚丸)
 Fishcake
 Crab stick (蟹柳)
 Octopus
 Fried tofu
 Wonton (雲吞)
 Siu mai (燒賣)
 Green vegetables (蔬菜)
 Chinese radish (蘿蔔)
 Spinach
 Rehydrated shiitake mushroom (冬菇)
 Winter mushrooms

Noodles

Soup
The soup is usually flavoured with curry. Some vendors allow customers to choose other flavours.

See also

 Cha chaan teng
 Dai pai dong
 Greasy spoon

References

Fast food
Hong Kong noodle dishes